Georgie Bleu Farmer (born 26 May 2001) is an British actor. He is known for his roles in the Disney Channel series The Evermoor Chronicles (2014–2017) and the Netflix series Wednesday (2022–).

Early life
Farmer was born and raised in Leytonstone, East London. He has three older siblings; his brother Harry also acts. Farmer took Saturday classes at the Stage One Theatre School from the age of eight. He attended Sylvia Young Theatre School.

Career
Farmer began his career in the music video for Jessie J's "Who's Laughing Now", the play Rest Upon the Wind at the now defunct Tristan Bates Theatre in London and Unity Theatre in Liverpool, and the CBBC series The Ministry of Curious Stuff. He then played Toots in the National Theatre production of Emil and the Detectives.

In 2014, Farmer began starring in the Disney Channel UK series The Evermoor Chronicles (also known as just Evermoor in some countries) as Jake Crossley, a role he would play for both series. Farmer made his feature film debut in 2018 with a minor role in Steven Spielberg's Ready Player One and a voice role in Andy Serkis' Mowgli: Legend of the Jungle for Netflix. In 2020, Farmer appeared alongside his brother Harry in the short film Of Wolves and Lambs and the play For the Sake of the Argument at Bridewell Theatre.

As of 2022, Farmer stars as the gorgon Ajax Petropolus in the Tim Burton's Netflix series Wednesday, centred around the character Wednesday Addams of The Addams Family.

Filmography

Music videos
 "Who's Laughing Now" (2011), Jessie J

Stage

References

External links
 
 Georgie Farmer at Spotlight

2001 births
21st-century English male actors
Alumni of the Sylvia Young Theatre School
English male child actors
English male stage actors
English male television actors

Living people
Male actors from London
People from Leytonstone